Walter A. Duffy was a member of the Wisconsin State Assembly. Duffy was first elected to the Assembly in 1914, succeeding Hubert H. Peavey, a future member of the United States House of Representatives. He was re-elected in 1916. Additionally, Duffy was a member of the Bayfield County, Wisconsin Board of Supervisors. He was a Republican. Duffy was born in Washburn, Wisconsin in 1889.

References

People from Washburn, Wisconsin
County supervisors in Wisconsin
1889 births
Year of death missing
Republican Party members of the Wisconsin State Assembly